On July 25, 1822, William Hendricks (DR) of  resigned to run for Governor of Indiana.  Hendricks had represented the state since it was first admitted to the Union.

Election results

Jennings had previously served as delegate for Indiana Territory in the 11th through 14th Congresses.  Jennings took his seat December 2

See also
List of special elections to the United States House of Representatives

References

At-large congressional district special election
Indiana At-large
1822 At-large
Indiana 1822 At-large
Indiana 1822 At-large
United States House of Representatives 1822 At-large